Dick Kasperek (born February 6, 1943) is a former professional American football player who played center for three seasons for the St. Louis Cardinals.

References

1943 births
Living people
American football offensive linemen
Iowa State Cyclones football players
St. Louis Cardinals (football) players
People from St. Peter, Minnesota
Players of American football from Minnesota